Novokaypanovo (Yañı Qaypan) is a rural locality (a selo) in Bul-Kaypanovsky Selsoviet, Tatyshlinsky District, Bashkortostan, Russia. The population was 485 as of 2010. There are five streets.

Geography 
Novokaypanovo is located 9 km northwest of Verkhniye Tatyshly (the district's administrative centre) by road. Bul-Kaypanovo is the nearest rural locality.

References 

Rural localities in Tatyshlinsky District